Edgars Bergs (born 15 September 1984 in Saldus) is a Paralympian athlete from Latvia competing mainly in category F35 throws events.

Edgars competed in the shot put and discus in both 2004 Summer Paralympics and 2008 Summer Paralympics picking up a bronze in the F35 discus and silver in the F35 shot put in Athens and a silver in the F35/36 shot put in Beijing.

External links

 

1984 births
Living people
Paralympic athletes of Latvia
Athletes (track and field) at the 2004 Summer Paralympics
Athletes (track and field) at the 2008 Summer Paralympics
Athletes (track and field) at the 2016 Summer Paralympics
Paralympic silver medalists for Latvia
Paralympic bronze medalists for Latvia
Medalists at the 2004 Summer Paralympics
Medalists at the 2008 Summer Paralympics
Medalists at the 2016 Summer Paralympics
Paralympic medalists in athletics (track and field)
Latvian male discus throwers
Latvian male shot putters